The Quinnipiac Bobcats women's basketball team represents Quinnipiac University in Hamden, Connecticut, United States. The school's team currently competes in the Metro Atlantic Athletic Conference.

History
Quinnipiac began play in Division I in 1998. They joined the Northeast Conference in 1999, playing until 2013, when they joined the MAAC. They have made the NCAA Tournament in 2013, 2015, and 2017. They made the Sweet Sixteen in the latter year by garnering their first ever Tournament win along with the furthest they have ever made in the NCAA Tournament. This was the first time since 2007 (Marist) that a MAAC team had made the Sweet Sixteen. They have made the WNIT in 2008, 2012, 2014, and 2016. Since joining Division I, the Bobcats (as of the end of the 2015–16 season) have a record of 335–207.

Postseason appearances

NCAA Division I tournament results
The Bobcats have made the NCAA Division I women's basketball tournament four times. They have a record of 3–4.

NCAA Division II tournament results
The Bobcats, then known as the Braves, made the NCAA Division II women's basketball tournament three times. They had a record of 3–3.

WNIT appearances
The Bobcats have made the Women's National Invitation Tournament five times. They have a record of 2–4.

References

External links